WSW  may refer to:
West-southwest, a compass direction (one of the eight "half-winds")
Women who have sex with women

Media
Wall Street Week, a business show on the US Public Broadcasting Service (PBS) 
War§ow, a video game
World Socialist Website, a news organization

Science
World Space Week, UN-declared space celebration held October 4–10 annually
WSW, the SAME code for a Winter Storm Warning

Transport
Wandsworth Common railway station, London, England, National Rail station code

Organizations
Western Sydney Wanderers FC, an Australian men's association football club
Western Sydney Wanderers FC (W-League), an Australian women's association football club
Wojskowa Służba Wewnętrzna, a former Polish military counterintelligence and military police service
Wo Shing Wo, a Triad gang
World Series Wrestling